Aleksandr Sergeyevich Butenko (born 20 July 1998) is a Russian football player. He plays for FC Volgar Astrakhan.

Club career
He made his debut in the Russian Professional Football League for FC Krasnodar-2 on 4 August 2016 in a game against FC Armavir.

On 13 June 2019, he joined FC Volgar Astrakhan on loan. He rejoined Volgar on a permanent basis on 11 June 2020.

References

External links
 
 

1998 births
Sportspeople from Astrakhan
Living people
Russian footballers
Association football midfielders
Association football forwards
FC Krasnodar-2 players
FC Milsami Orhei players
FC Volgar Astrakhan players
Moldovan Super Liga players
Russian First League players
Russian Second League players
Russian expatriate footballers
Expatriate footballers in Moldova
Russian expatriate sportspeople in Moldova